Roger Caron (born June 3, 1962) is an American football coach and former player. He played professionally as an offensive tackle for two seasons in the National Football League (NFL) with the Indianapolis Colts. He played college football at Harvard University and was selected by the Colts in the fifth round of the 1985 NFL Draft. Caron served two stints as the head coach for the Pomona-Pitzer Sagehens, the joint team of Pomona College and Pitzer College, from 1994 to 2004 and 2007 to 2016, compiling a record of 72–110.

Caron graduated Harvard with a degree in European history in 1985. While at Harvard he was named NCAA Division I-AA first-team Kodak and AP All-American and twice named first-team All-Ivy League. After his stint with the Colts he secured his first coaching job as an assistant with Williams College, where he helped the school's football program to a 45–9–2 record over seven years, which included a 23-game winning streak and 14 straight wins within its "Little Three" division. Caron was also the head wrestling coach at Williams from 1987 to 1994.

Caron now works as a high school history and social sciences teacher, the coordinator of student athlete recruitment, and the head football coach at Ransom Everglades School in Miami, Florida.

Head coaching record

College football

References

External links
 Pomona-Pitzer profile
 

1962 births
Living people
American football offensive tackles
Harvard Crimson football players
Indianapolis Colts players
Pomona-Pitzer Sagehens football coaches
Williams Ephs football coaches
College wrestling coaches in the United States
High school football coaches in Connecticut
High school football coaches in Florida
People from Norwell, Massachusetts
Sportspeople from Plymouth County, Massachusetts
Coaches of American football from Massachusetts
Players of American football from Massachusetts